TSS Great Western was a passenger vessel built for the Great Western Railway in 1902.

History

She was built by Laird Brothers in Birkenhead for the Great Western Railway as a twin-screw steamer for the Irish Sea ferry service between Milford Haven and Waterford. She was a sister ship to TSS Great Southern.

Later in her career she operated occasionally from Weymouth.

In 1931 it was reported that she achieved a record crossing from Fishguard to Waterford, maintaining an average speed of 19.9 knots.

In 1933 she was succeeded by a new ship of the same name, TSS Great Western and was renamed G.W.R. No. 20 until sold for scrapping by John Cashmore of Newport, Monmouthshire.

References

1901 ships
Passenger ships of the United Kingdom
Steamships of the United Kingdom
Ships built on the River Mersey
Ships of the Great Western Railway